Richard Franklin Vander Veen (November 26, 1922 – March 3, 2006) was a politician from the U.S. state of Michigan.

Early life and education
Born in Grand Rapids, Michigan, Vander Veen attended the local public schools and graduated from Muskegon High School in 1940. He earned a B.S from the University of South Carolina in 1946 and an LL.B. from Harvard Law School in 1949. He was admitted to the Michigan bar in 1949 and commenced practice in Grand Rapids. In 1951, he, Walter Freihofer and George Cook formed what was to become the third-largest law firm in Grand Rapids. He retired from the law firm when he was elected to Congress. He is a relative of Musician Anthony Keidis.

Military service
With the outbreak of World War II, Vander Veen enlisted in the United States Navy in January 1941 and served until 1946, seeing active duty in the South Pacific Theater. He also served in the Korean War from 1950 to 1952 with the rank of lieutenant (junior grade).

Political career

In 1958, Vander Veen made an unsuccessful bid as the Democratic Party candidate to unseat incumbent Republican U.S. Representative Gerald Ford in Michigan's 5th congressional district. He became chair of the Michigan Fifth District Democratic Party in 1959 and was an unsuccessful candidate in the Democratic primary election for Lieutenant Governor of Michigan in 1960, losing to T. John Lesinski. He was chairman of the Michigan State Democratic Convention in 1960, and was a delegate to the state conventions in 1962 and 1964. He served on the Michigan State Mental Health Commission, 1958–1963, and the Michigan State Highway Commission, 1964–1969. In 1969, he was elected to the East Grand Rapids Board of Education.

After Gerald Ford resigned his House seat in 1973 to become Vice President of the United States, Vander Veen was elected in a special election on February 18, 1974, to fill Ford's seat in the 93rd Congress. Vander Veen's election from the heavily Republican district was seen as a stunning upset defeat for the Republican Party. He was the only Democrat to be elected to Congress from the Grand Rapids area from 1912 to 2022. The Republican candidate, Robert VanderLaan, was the Republican leader of the Michigan Senate and, up to that point, had never lost an election. Vander Veen turned the election into a referendum on the increasingly unpopular U.S. President Richard Nixon. He stopped campaigning directly against his opponent, and instead took out newspaper advertisements "in which he promised to do his utmost to dislodge Nixon and turn the presidency over to Ford, a political folk hero in the district." This upset caused a panic in the Republican Party leadership, as it appeared to foreshadow more losses for the party in the November elections. Political analyst Larry Sabato writes in his Crystal Ball newsletter that Vander Veen's capture of Gerald Ford's solidly Republican district after Ford had been elevated to the Vice Presidency was an electrifying victory that foreshadowed the Democratic Watergate landslide of November 1974. (see also 1974 Midterm Senate and House elections)

Vander Veen was reelected in November 1974 to a full term in the 94th Congress, but lost his seat in 1976 to Republican Harold S. Sawyer. In 1978, Vander Veen ran for the United States Senate, but lost his bid for the Democratic nomination to Carl Levin, who went on to win the general election in November.

Vander Veen formed two environmental companies: Resource Energy and Enigered. In 1990, he founded the Ryerson Library Foundation, and served as its president.

After his service in Congress, Vander Veen served as a member of the Michigan State Waterways Commission. Vander Veen died of prostate cancer at his home in East Grand Rapids at the age of 83.

References

External links
 The Political Graveyard
 Congressman Vern Ehlers' note to Members of Congress about the death of former Congressman Vander Veen

1922 births
2006 deaths
Politicians from Grand Rapids, Michigan
American people of Dutch descent
Democratic Party members of the United States House of Representatives from Michigan
20th-century American politicians
School board members in Michigan
People from East Grand Rapids, Michigan
Harvard Law School alumni
University of South Carolina alumni
United States Navy personnel of World War II
United States Navy personnel of the Korean War
Deaths from prostate cancer
Deaths from cancer in Michigan